National Media Council may refer to:

 National Media Council (Poland), a government organisation in Poland.
 National Media Council (United Arab Emirates), a former government organisation in the United Arab Emirates.